John Henry William Shore Kemmis (October 1, 1867 – October 13, 1942) was a politician from Alberta, Canada. He served in the Legislative Assembly of Alberta from 1911 to 1921.

Political career
Kemmis first ran for the Alberta Legislature as a Conservative candidate in the 1905 general election. He finished a very strong third place in the electoral district of Pincher Creek.  He ran again in a by-election on October 31, 1911 and defeated Liberal candidate J.F. Ross.

In the 1913 general election Kemmis retained his seat by a slim margin of 61 votes.  In 1917 he defeated two other candidates.  He retired from the Legislature at dissolution in 1921. He died in Calgary, Alberta in 1942.

References

External links
Legislative Assembly of Alberta Members Listing

Progressive Conservative Association of Alberta MLAs
People from Ooty
1942 deaths
1867 births